Antispila voraginella is a species of moth of the family Heliozelidae. It is found in the Rocky Mountains, including Utah, Arizona and western Texas.

There is probably only one generation per year, with adults emerging from April to June.

The larvae feed on Vitis arizonica. They mine the leaves of their host plant and are usually gregarious with mines forming large pale blotches. Larvae have been found in June and July in the northern part of the range, but through September in monsoonal areas to the south.

References

Moths described in 1927
Heliozelidae